Apodasya is a genus of beetle in the family Cerambycidae, named by Pascoe in 1863. The genus name Chaetosoma was published first, but this older name has been declared unavailable under the ICZN.

Species
 Apodasya kenyensis Breuning, 1966
 Apodasya pilosa (Chevrolat, 1843)

References

Crossotini